Gary Arbuckle (born 16 August 1984, in Glasgow) is a Scottish footballer.

Career

Arbuckle began his career with Celtic, but failed to play a first team game for them. He did win the Scottish Youth Cup in 2003. He started the final, as Celtic beat Aberdeen 3–1 at McDiarmid Park. Arbuckle signed for Clyde in the summer of 2004, when he was 19. He made his debut in a 2–1 victory against rivals Partick Thistle, in the opening game of the 2004–05 season. Arbuckle hit a famous wonderstrike in a Scottish Cup 4th Round replay against Ross County, which sent Clyde through to the Quarter Finals, to meet his former club, Celtic. 

2005–06 was a very frustrating season for Arbuckle. Under new manager Graham Roberts, he only made two league starts and was not offered a new contract at the end of the season. He was eventually offered a deal by new manager Joe Miller just before the start of the 2006–07 season and played a much bigger role in that campaign. Arbuckle finished the 2006–07 season as Clyde's top goalscorer, with 11 league goals.

In July 2007, Arbuckle was listed as a trialist in pre-season games for the fourth year in a row. He was given a one-year contract extension. He made his 100th Clyde appearance against St Johnstone in August 2007 but was released in May 2008, having made 128 appearances in all competitions, scoring 20 goals.

Arbuckle then joined Queen of the South in July 2008 after impressing in a trial.

Arbuckle broke his leg in two places on 3 January 2009 against Greenock Morton. He was released by Queens at the end of the season. After a spell with Kilbirnie Ladeside, Arbuckle remained in junior football with Arthurlie.

See also
Clyde F.C. season 2004-05 | 2005-06 | 2006-07 | 2007-08

References

External links

1984 births
Living people
Scottish footballers
Celtic F.C. players
Clyde F.C. players
Queen of the South F.C. players
Scottish Football League players
Footballers from Glasgow
Association football forwards
Kilbirnie Ladeside F.C. players
Arthurlie F.C. players
Yoker Athletic F.C. players
Ayr United F.C. players
West of Scotland Football League players